The River Cassley in Sutherland, in northern Scotland, joins the River Oykel to form the Kyle of Sutherland at Invercassley (Inbhir Charsla).  The Kyle is subsequently joined by the River Shin and River Carron (Abhainn Charrann) before it becomes the Dornoch Firth and enters the North Sea. The main road bridge over the river is at Rosehall, halfway between the mouth and the impressive Achness Waterfall or Cassley Falls.

Like its more illustrious neighbour the Oykel, the Cassley is noted for its salmon and trout fishing. The lower river is in the same ownership as the Achaness Hotel at Rosehall, which provides accommodation and ghillies for visiting fishermen.

Cassley